Eric Tiki "Tiny" Leys (25 May 1907 – 21 January 1989) was a New Zealand rugby union player. A halfback, Leys represented  at a provincial level, and was a member of the New Zealand national side, the All Blacks, on their 1929 tour of Australia. He played five matches on that tour, including one international.

References

1907 births
1989 deaths
Rugby union players from Wellington City
People educated at Wellington College (New Zealand)
New Zealand rugby union players
New Zealand international rugby union players
Wellington rugby union players
Rugby union scrum-halves